Pseudoplon is a genus of beetles in the family Cerambycidae, containing the following species:

 Pseudoplon oculatum Martins, 1971
 Pseudoplon rasile Napp & Martins, 1985
 Pseudoplon transversum Napp & Martins, 1985

References

Ibidionini